Richard L. Landau (1916 – November 3, 2015) was a leader in endocrinology research at the University of Chicago. He published more than 90 papers and served as a member of the editorial board at the Journal of the American Medical Association.

Biography
Landau was born to a Jewish family, the son of Amelia and Milton Landau. His mother was an activist who fought for woman's suffrage, served as the chair of a chapter of the ACLU, and hosted social worker Jane Addams at her home; his father operated a linen-rental company. He graduated with an M.D. from Washington University and in 1940 he worked under  Allan Kenyon at the University of Chicago. During World War II he served as a doctor in the Pacific Theater.

Personal life
In 1944, he married his secretary Claire Schmuckel; they had two children, Kay Landau Fricke and Susan Landau Axelrod (married to David Axelrod).

References

American endocrinologists
1916 births
2015 deaths
20th-century American Jews
21st-century American Jews
Washington University in St. Louis alumni
American military personnel of World War II
University of Chicago faculty